Punyalan Agarbattis is a 2013 Indian Malayalam-language satirical comedy film written, co-produced and directed by Ranjith Sankar, starring Jayasurya, Nyla Usha, Aju Varghese, Rachana Narayanankutty, Innocent and Sreejith Ravi. The film follows the tale of the young entrepreneur Joy Thakkolkaran (Jayasurya) and his business venture "Punyalan Agarbattis" in the city of Thrissur. The film is produced by Jayasurya and Ranjith Sankar under the banner of Dreams N Beyond and features music composed by Bijibal.The film was a commercial success at the box-office. A sequel of the film titled 'Punyalan Private Limited' was made in 2017, and it casts many of the members of original cast.

Plot
The movie follows the inspiring tale of an entrepreneur, Joy Thakolkaaran, who owns a firm named 'Punyalan Agarbathis'. The firm in involved in the production of incense sticks from elephant dung. The first half moves around how it becomes nearly impossible for him to acquire necessary raw material (elephant dung) and when he finally does acquire it devil follows him in the form of a hartal. Struggling between the deadline given by the court and the unexpected hartal, he decides to smuggle the raw material on the day of the hartal. When the RIP followers get wind of this they attack joy and destroy his godown and means of transportation. The rest of the movie revolves around how Joy is pressured with various problems around him and how help comes from the unexpected. The party uses different methods to mentally depreciate Joy. But he overcomes them by his optimistic attitude and his friends and family. In the end of the movie the tag line reads "you can conquer the whole world if you are ready to believe in yourself"

Cast
 Jayasurya as Joy Thakkolkaran
 Aju Varghese as Greenu Sharma
 Nyla Usha as Anu Joy
 Sreejith Ravi as Abhayakumar (Thuthuru)
 Innocent as John Thakkolkaran, Joy's grandfather
 Rachana Narayanankutty as Advocate Sai
 T. G. Ravi as Achuthan Maash, a social worker
 Idavela Babu as K C Mathews
 Mala Aravindan as Ayyappan
 Sunil Sukhada as Judge
 Shivaji Guruvayoor as Advocate Hassan Marakkar
 Gokulan As Jimbruttan 
 Lishoy as Joy's uncle
 Jayaraj Warrier as Kaattalan Jose
 Sabumon Abdusamad as Idivettu Sabu
 Thesni Khan as Gracy
 Ponnamma Babu as Usha
 Irshad as Amal
 Vinod Kovoor as Pappan
 Sudheer Karamana as Kollur Jayaprakash
 Sunil Babu as Mahout Eldho

Production

Jayasurya was selected for playing the lead. Nyla Usha to play the role of his wife. The popular senior actor Innocent was cast to play the grandfather of hero.

The filming began at Thrissur on 17 August 2013.

Release
The film was released on 29 December 2013.

The film was both commercial and critical success. The film collected ₹7 crore from Kerala box office.

Soundtrack

Bijibal composed the background score and the songs in the film.. The film marked the debut of Jayasurya as a singer in films.  The lyrics are written by Santhosh Varma.

References

External links
 

Films shot in Thrissur
2010s Malayalam-language films
Films directed by Ranjith Sankar